Polańczyk  (Polianchyk) is a village in Lesko County, Subcarpathian Voivodeship, in south-eastern Poland. It lies in, and serves as the seat of, the administrative district of Gmina Solina. In 2002 the village had a population of 830.

It was first mentioned in 1580. Its name comes from the West Slavic word polana, meaning "glade". It is a spa village that lies near the shores of Lake Solina and is a popular area for tourists visiting the lake.

References

Villages in Lesko County
Spa towns in Poland